Byung-joon, also spelled Byong-joon, Byoung-jun, or Byung-jun, is a Korean masculine given name. There are 17 hanja with the reading "byung" and 34 hanja with the reading "joon" on the South Korean government's official list of hanja which may be used in given names.

People with this name include:
Song Byeong-jun (1857–1925), Joseon Dynasty politician and soldier
Kim Byong-joon (born 1954), South Korean politician
No Byung-jun (born 1979), South Korean football player
Kim Byeong-jun (speed skater) (born 1988), South Korean speed skater
Kim Byoung-jun (born 1991), South Korean track and field athlete

See also
List of Korean given names

References

Korean masculine given names